Lauren Charlotte Harries (born James Charles Harries; 6 March 1978) is an English media personality. As a child she was known for her knowledge of antiques, appearing on numerous television shows including Wogan and After Dark. In later life, she has been known for her appearances on television series such as Celebrity Big Brother, Big Brother's Bit on the Side, This Morning and Naked Attraction.

Early life
Lauren Charlotte Harries was born James Charles Harries on 6 March 1978 in Surrey, England. Harries' father, Mark Harries, worked in the hotel business and catering trade. The family moved to Cardiff when Harries was still a baby. From the age of five, she enjoyed art and antiques, and had an apparent ability to spot bargains at local jumble sales and second-hand shops.

Career

Harries began making television appearances in August 1988 on Terry Wogan's chat show, Wogan. The then ten-year-old demonstrated a good knowledge of antiques. At 13, she wrote an antique guide, Rags to Riches.

In 2004, after Harries had undergone gender reassignment, Channel 4 broadcast a documentary Little Lady Fauntleroy made by actor Keith Allen in which Allen interviewed the Harries family. Allen's documentary showed that the Harries family was not all they seemed; The counsellor who looked after Lauren during her sex change operation was called Lesley Stewart. And Lesley Stewart turns out to be the "business name" of Kaye Harries, Lauren's own mother. Plus it turns out that all their qualifications, doctorates in metaphysics and counselling degrees, were issued by the Cardiff College of Humanistic Studies which, happily, is located at Tudor Cottage, their own house. They've certified themselves. The documentary was released on DVD on 4 July 2005. In October 2006, Harries appeared in the Channel 5 television series Trust Me – I'm a Beauty Therapist, which was filmed on location in a beauty therapist's in Swansea, Wales. In November 2008, Harries was featured as a cover girl in the specialist lifestyle magazine Transliving.

In August 2013, Harries became a housemate on the twelfth series of Celebrity Big Brother. She finished in third place. In September 2013, she appeared on Celebrity Juice. Her debut single "I Am a Woman" was released in January 2015. Harries released a follow-up single, "Upadoo" in May 2018. In August 2019, Harries made an appearance on the Channel 4 dating series Naked Attraction, becoming the first celebrity to appear on the series.

Personal life
Harries' schooling suffered from the heightened publicity. By the age of 14, Harries suffered depression and agoraphobia, which led to a nervous breakdown and suicide attempt. Media opportunities and resulting business reduced as Harries grew up. In the recession of the early 1990s, the family's businesses failed. One family shop was destroyed by fire, and her father was convicted of insurance fraud. Harries sold some of her collections to assist in the support of the family. Harries then took three GCSEs after home tutoring.

As a child, Harries had been taken by her family to see a doctor because she displayed feminine mannerisms. Later, Harries decided to transition from male to female, change her name to Lauren Charlotte, and investigated gender reassignment surgery, which was carried out in 2001. Funding for this was generated from publicity arranged by Max Clifford.

On 8 July 2005, a group of five to seven men attacked Harries, her father and her brother in the family home. One 17-year-old boy was later fined and given a supervision order for his role in the incident.

Filmography

References

External links
 – official site

Living people
English Buddhists
LGBT Buddhists
Welsh LGBT entertainers
Mass media people from Cardiff
LGBT media personalities
Transgender women
British media personalities
1978 births